Vinícius Justino Calamari (born 1 June 1988) is a Brazilian professional footballer who plays as a forward for  club Salam Zgharta.

Club career
Calamari signed for Penafiel on 9 August 2007. He played 10 times for the club in the Portuguese second division. At the end of the season, he was released. In January 2009 he was signed by Rio Branco of Paraná state. He was re-signed by Rio Branco for the 2010 state league.

In 2009, Brazilian Football Confederation (CBF) sued Penafiel for training compensation, as Penafiel was his first professional club. On 24 November 2010, FIFA Dispute Resolution Chamber decided that Penafiel had to pay €72,500 to CBF. In March 2011 he was signed by Caxias, but released in April.

References

External links
 
 
 
 
 Vinícius Calamari at Eurosport.com

1988 births
People from Nova Iguaçu
Living people
Brazilian footballers
Association football forwards
Nova Iguaçu Futebol Clube players
Brazilian expatriate footballers
Expatriate footballers in Spain
Brazilian expatriate sportspeople in Spain
Atlético Madrid footballers
Expatriate footballers in Portugal
Brazilian expatriate sportspeople in Portugal
F.C. Penafiel players
Rio Branco Sport Club players
Sociedade Esportiva e Recreativa Caxias do Sul players
Bonsucesso Futebol Clube players
Expatriate footballers in Oman
Expatriate footballers in the United Arab Emirates
Dubai CSC players
Expatriate footballers in Lebanon
Lebanese Premier League players
Salam Zgharta FC players
Sportspeople from Rio de Janeiro (state)